Isiah "Ike" Williams (August 2, 1923 – September 5, 1994) was a lightweight world boxing champion. He took the World Lightweight Championship in April 1945 and made eight successful defenses of the title against six different fighters prior to losing the championship to Jimmy Carter in 1951. Williams was known for his great right hand, and was named to The Ring magazine's list of 100 greatest punchers of all time as well as The Ring magazine Fighter of the Year for 1948. Williams was The Ring magazine's Fighter of the Year for 1948, was inducted into The Ring Boxing Hall of Fame (disbanded in 1987), and was an inaugural 1990 inductee to the International Boxing Hall of Fame.

Early life
Williams was born in Brunswick, Georgia on August 2, 1923. He did not turn professional until 1940 when he began boxing in Trenton, New Jersey. According to boxing lore, Williams worked as a newsboy after his family's move to Trenton, and first began boxing using his fists to defend the corner where he sold his papers.

Professional career
During his career, Williams faced and defeated former lightweight champions Sammy Angott, Bob Montgomery, and Beau Jack.

Taking the NBA World Lightweight Championship, April 1945
Williams was inducted into the U.S. Army after a close non-title win against the great lightweight Sammy Angott by ten-round decision at Shibe Park in Philadelphia on September 6, 1944, though he continued regular professional boxing during his service.

Williams won the NBA World Lightweight Championship before a crowd of 35,000 by a second-round knockout of Juan Zurita in Mexico City on April 18, 1945. Their first planned meeting in Philadelphia had been cancelled by the Pennsylvania Boxing Commission who recognized Bob Montgomery as the lightweight champion. Williams made a two fisted attack to the head of Zurita in the second which Zurita could not hold off, though he had made an effective defense in the first round. It was Zurita's first title defense. Shortly after Zurita was counted out, Williams' corner was crowded by fans, and several policeman were required to clear the ring before Williams could return to his dressing room.

World Lightweight Title defense against Bob Montgomery, August 1947
In one of his most important title defenses, he achieved a knockout of black boxer Bob Montgomery, NYSAC Lightweight Champion, at Municipal Stadium in Philadelphia in six rounds on August 4, 1947, to become the undisputed World Lightweight Champion. Montgomery was down for a count of nine in the sixth before the bout was stopped. The victory also avenged a twelfth-round knockout loss to Montgomery from January 25, 1944. At least one source had Williams with an edge in three of the rounds, with one to Montgomery, and one too close to call. The blow that sent Montgomery to the mat in the sixth was a right to the chin by the hard punching Williams. Montgomery rose after nine but continued to take punches and was up against the ropes, and sinking to the mat on his knees before the referee stopped the bout.

World Lightweight Title defense against Jesse Flores, September 1948
On September 23, 1948, Williams successfully defended his Lightweight title against Jesse Flores winning in a tenth-round technical knockout at Yankee Stadium in New York's Bronx. Flores had been on the mat five times during the fight, down twice in the fifth and twice in the eighth. The final blows were a left hook and then a right that sent Flores to the mat 2:07 into the tenth round.

World Lightweight Title defense against Enrique Bolanos, July 1949
On July 21, 1949, Williams defended his title against Enrique Bolanos winning in a fourth-round technical knockout before a crowd of near 19,000 at Wrigley Field in Los Angeles. Bolanos had been sent to the canvas twice before referee Jack Dempsey decided to end the bout 2:40 into the fourth round. Bolanos was knocked to the mat for a count of eight early in the fourth, and then after rising received a series of left and right hooks that sent him to his knees near William's corner. Bolanos' manager George Parnassus threw in the towel and referee Dempsey abruptly ended the bout causing the fight to be recorded as a technical knock out.

World Lightweight Title defense against Freddy Dawson, December 1949
On December 5, 1949, Williams defeated Freddy Dawson in a close fifteen-round decision before 10,389 fans at Convention Hall in Philadelphia. He had defeated Dawson twice in previous meetings and led in the early betting. In the post-fight decision, the two judges gave him the decision by only one round, ruling that 8 rounds were won by him and 7 by Dawson. The referee, who was closer to the action, gave him 9 rounds to 6 for Dawson. There were no knockdowns in the bout, and according to one source only one hard solid punch, a hard left to Dawson's head in the fifth. Boxing reporters already were concerned about Williams' ability to make the lightweight limit prior to his bout with Dawson, an issue that would arise again in his bout with Jimmy Carter.  There were several newspaper reports that wrote of Williams' fine for informing the press of a potential bribe of the judges he claimed he had heard about in a phone call.  He was fined by the boxing commission for informing the press of the possible bribe before he had first informed the commission.

On January 17, 1949, Williams first defeated Johhny Bratton by a comfortable margin in the Arena in Philadelphia, Pennsylvania in a ten-round decision before a satisfied crowd of 8,000 fans.  Williams had taken a two-month lay-off from his fight schedule to help heal a broken hand.  The judges scored 6-2 and 7-3 for Bratton, while the referee scored a closer 5-4-1 decision.  Bratton put up a defense, and even stunned Williams momentarily in the eighth with a blow to the jaw, but lacked the skills at 21 to defeat Williams. On January 20, 1950, before a crowd of 12,000 at Chicago Stadium, Williams won an eighth-round technical knockout against Bratton who was forced to leave the ring with a broken jaw. Bratton later claimed the injury took place in round three.  Williams hammered his opponent particularly hard in the second and seventh rounds, and was comfortably ahead on points, losing only one of the eight rounds fought to Bratton.  Bratton ended the bout by turning his back and signalling the referee to end the fight.  After returning to boxing, Bratton would briefly take the NBA World Welterweight Championship in March 1951, holding it only two months.

Loss of World Lightweight Title against Jimmy Carter, May 1951
He held on to the crown until May 25, 1951, when he was stopped by Jimmy Carter in a fourteenth-round technical knockout at New York's Madison Square Garden. Williams had been sent to the canvas four times before the fight was called. Williams was down for a count of five and eight in the fifth.  He was down for a count of four and then six in the fourteenth before the referee ended the fight.  Williams believed that his trouble making weight had weakened him for the fight.

Williams, for part of his career, was managed by Frank "Blinky" Palermo, who later was suspected of having ties to organized crime.  According to Williams, he was blackballed by the boxing managers guild when he sought to manage himself. Palermo informed him he could resolve his problems with the guild, and Williams agreed to let Palermo manage him. Williams testified before the Kefauver Commission that Palermo did not arrange for him to throw any fights, but that he shorted him his share of his purses. Nevertheless, Williams did claim to have taken a dive against Chuck Davey, a much hyped contender for the welterweight crown.

Testifying before Congress, 1961
In 1961 Williams testified before Congress on antitrust in boxing. In his testimony, Williams stated that all boxers are asked to take bribes and that he was boycotted as a result of trying to manage himself. He explained that he could not get a fight because he did not use a manager and that he could not book a fight until he found a manager from the manager's guild. He explained that he did not receive his share of his purse in two fights which included Jesse Flores in Yankee Stadium, for the lightweight title on September 23, 1948 and Beau Jack at Shibe Park in Philadelphia, on July 12, 1948 and September 23, 1948. In those fights the money owed him was $32,500 and $32,400. He testified he told the boxing association to temporarily hold on to the money for these two fights for tax purposes. Later when he asked for his money, he discovered that his shares of the profits had been taken by his manager, who claimed to have fallen on hard times and spent it. Williams still had to pay the taxes on his share of the profits, though he never received them.

He further testified that his manager was offered $30,000 for him to throw a championship fight against Freddy Dawson in Philadelphia on December 5, 1949, though he declined. He testified that ten minutes before the fight he heard the judges being told if he did not win by a knock out that the fight would go to Dawson. Williams won the fight and told the media afterwards that he had heard a rumor that the fight would be fixed to go to Dawson by decision of the judges if he did not win by a knockout. Williams believed that the Judges upon hearing that he called the media decided to not fix the fight by giving an unfair decision to Dawson. Nonetheless, Williams was fined $500 for his comments to the media.

Williams also recalled a fight against Kid Gavilán on January 28, 1949 at Madison Square Garden, in which he was offered $100,000 to throw the fight. Again, Ike Williams did not take the money, an action he regretted because he lost the fight even though a plurality of reporters in subsequent news stories that cover the fight believed he had won. This made Williams conclude that the judges may have also been influenced in this fight to vote for his opponent in the case of a points decision.

Williams also believed he lost his lightweight title in a bout with the boxer Jimmy Carter on May 25, 1951 in a bout where the judges were also influenced. He testified he was again offered to throw the fight, for a sum of $50,000. Again, Williams said he regretted not taking the money as he lost the fight in a similar fashion as before.

Williams testified he never took the money offered to him to fix fights because too many people were counting on him and that too many of his friends had bet their hard earned money on him.

Death
Williams died on September 5, 1994 at his home in the Wilshire District of Los Angeles of natural causes.

Professional boxing record
All information in this section is derived from BoxRec, unless otherwise stated.

Official record

All newspaper decisions are officially regarded as “no decision” bouts and are not counted in the win/loss/draw column

Unofficial record

Record with the inclusion of newspaper decisions in the win/loss/draw column.

World Titles

See also
Lineal championship
List of lightweight boxing champions

References

External links
 
 https://boxrec.com/media/index.php/National_Boxing_Association%27s_Quarterly_Ratings:_1942
 https://boxrec.com/media/index.php/National_Boxing_Association%27s_Quarterly_Ratings:_1943
 https://boxrec.com/media/index.php/The_Ring_Magazine%27s_Annual_Ratings:_Lightweight--1940s
 https://titlehistories.com/boxing/na/usa/ny/nysac-l.html

1923 births
1994 deaths
Boxers from Georgia (U.S. state)
Lightweight boxers
World lightweight boxing champions
International Boxing Hall of Fame inductees
People from Brunswick, Georgia
American male boxers
United States Army personnel of World War II
20th-century African-American sportspeople
African-American boxers
African Americans in World War II
African-American United States Army personnel